This is a list of all teams and players who have won the Cork Senior A Hurling Championship since its inception in 2020.

By team

By year

References